Martin Kuhl (born 10 January 1965) is an English former professional footballer who played as a midfielder for many years in the Football League. He then went into coaching and was most recently manager of Staines Town until his departure in February 2020.

Playing career
He made 474 appearances in the Football League for Birmingham City, Sheffield United, Watford, Portsmouth, Derby County, Notts County and Bristol City. He then played for Happy Valley in Hong Kong and represented the Hong Kong League in matches against Mexico and Bulgaria, before returning to play in non-League football. He helped Portsmouth reach the 1992 FA Cup semifinal, but was one of three Pompey players to miss his kick as they lost in a penalty shootout to Liverpool.

Managerial career
Kuhl was assistant to manager Gary Waddock at Aldershot Town until October 2009, when the pair joined Wycombe Wanderers. He left the club in April 2011 after being suspended.

He went on to coach at the youth level at Reading: his son, Aaron, came through the youth team at the club. On 4 December 2015, after Steve Clarke was sacked as manager, Kuhl was put in charge of Reading on an interim basis. Kuhl left Reading in September 2017.

Kuhl joined Torquay United as assistant to new head coach Gary Owers on 13 September 2017. He was appointed manager of Basingstoke Town in December 2018, and left by mutual consent in September 2019.

In December 2019, Kuhl was appointed manager of Staines Town, before leaving the club via mutual consent in February 2020.

References

External links

Profile at Post War English & Scottish Football League A–Z Player's Database

1965 births
Living people
People from Frimley
English footballers
Association football midfielders
Birmingham City F.C. players
Sheffield United F.C. players
Watford F.C. players
Portsmouth F.C. players
Derby County F.C. players
Notts County F.C. players
Bristol City F.C. players
Happy Valley AA players
Farnborough F.C. players
Carshalton Athletic F.C. players
Aldershot Town F.C. players
English Football League players
Hong Kong First Division League players
English football managers
Aldershot Town F.C. managers
Reading F.C. managers
Basingstoke Town F.C. managers
Staines Town F.C. managers
Wycombe Wanderers F.C. non-playing staff
Reading F.C. non-playing staff
Torquay United F.C. non-playing staff
Expatriate footballers in Hong Kong
English expatriate sportspeople in Hong Kong
English expatriate footballers
Association football coaches